Kaare Vefling (19 May 1920 – 6 September 2001) was a Norwegian middle-distance runner. He competed in the men's 1500 metres at the 1948 Summer Olympics.

References

1920 births
2001 deaths
Athletes (track and field) at the 1948 Summer Olympics
Norwegian male middle-distance runners
Olympic athletes of Norway
Place of birth missing